Damjili – is a half-circular shaped cave site (6400-6000 BC) in Azerbaijan, where evidence of prehistoric human presence during the Paleolithic and Mesolithic was discovered.

Various stone tools, arrowheads, flint knives, remains of hearth and fossilized bones of animals have been found in the cave.

Traces of ochre were found in a grotto of the cave, lending credence to the idea, that the occupants had a desire to deal with symbolism and aesthetics. The sediment layers, in which the ochre was found are mixed with more tardy ones which suggests that the use ochre dates back to the Mousterian culture

Overview 
Damjili cave is the biggest cave among Avey Mountain caves. The front side of the cave has been destroyed as the result of floods over the years.

Location 
The site is situated in the South-Eastern part of the Avey Mountain of the Small Caucasus, that extends from Daş Salahlı village in the Gazakh rayon to the Khram River.

Name of the Cave 
The name Damjili is an allusion to "weeping water", that rinses through the natural cracks in the limestone cave walls (the Azeri word Damji translates to drop).

Damjili spring 
Water of Damjili spring dribbles down from the flinty top of the cave through the natural cracks. Pure and cold falling water drops are accumulating in the dent below and forming a spring. That is why the spring is called Damjili, literally meanining "with drops".

Excavations 
Damjılı cave was discovered for the first time in 1953 during the joint expedition of Russian scientist Zamyatin and Azerbaijani archaeologist Mammadali Husyenov.

Fragments of pottery dated back to the Bronze Age and Middle Ages were discovered from the primary excavations in the cave. The Paleolithic archaeological expedition formed under the History Museum of Academy of Science of Azerbaijan in 1956 conducted fundamental excavations in Damjili cave between 1956 and 1958 under the supervision of M.Huseynov.

In the result of this excavation, around 7,000 stone tools and more than 2,000 bones of hunting animals were found from different cultural layers of the cave.

In 2015–2017, a group of Azerbaijani and Japanese experts (led by the professor Yoshihiro Nishiaki of Tokyo University) conducted joint excavations in the area. The excavations began in 10 different directions. As a result, artefacts dating back to the Neolithic period, ruins of fireplaces, tools of Middle Paleolithic were discovered at a depth of 4 meters. The materials were investigated in Japanese laboratories.

Findings 
The tools found in the Damjili cave trace back to the Middle Paleolithic – Mousterian period, Upper Paleolithic, Mezolithic, Neolithic, Eneolithic periods and Bronze Age.

Scrapers, cutting tools, awls, knife-shaped tools of Upper paleolithic were mainly made from flint and obsidian stone.

Pencil-shaped nucleuses, small knife-shaped boards, tiny scrapers, cutting and pointed tools were attributed to Mezolithic, while arrowheads, polished stone object were attributed to the Neolithic period.

Mousterian  and Meseolithic period findings consist of triangular spikes, big circular cutting tools and nucleuses which are considered to be used for hunting.

Some of the scrapers made of basalt are in circular shapes.

Disk shaped nucleuses tools are considered to belong to Neanderthal people 100,000-80,000 years ago settled in Damjili.

See also 
Qazakh District

References

External links

1953 archaeological discoveries
Caves of Azerbaijan
Prehistoric sites in Azerbaijan
Archaeological sites in Azerbaijan
Mousterian